Ziniaré is a town located in the province of Oubritenga in Burkina Faso. It is the capital of Oubritenga Province and Plateau-Central Region.

References 

Populated places in the Plateau-Central Region
Oubritenga Province